Giuseppe Colombani is known as l'Alfier lombardo (the Pride of Lombardy. It's unrelated to Francesco Alfieri - the Italian word l'Alfier(e) means "the standard bearer".) He wrote a treatise on martial arts, published in 1711. It is the latest known treatise discussing the spadone, or longsword, before the revivalist movements of historical fencing in the 20th century.

Historical European martial arts